Aldonza is the name of:

Aldonza Alfonso de León (c. 1215–1266), illegitimate daughter of King Alfonso IX of León and his mistress Aldonza Martínez de Silva
Aldonza Lorenzo, the real name of Dulcinea del Toboso, a fictional character from Don Quixote
Antonio Aldonza (1926–2014), Spanish footballer